Neoterebra concava is a species of sea snail, a marine gastropod mollusk in the family Terebridae, the auger snails.

Description

Distribution

References

  Say, T. (1826) Descriptions of Marine Shells recently discovered on the Coast of the United States. Journal of the Academy of Natural Sciences of Philadelphia. Vol. 5(2):207-221.

External links
 Fedosov, A. E.; Malcolm, G.; Terryn, Y.; Gorson, J.; Modica, M. V.; Holford, M.; Puillandre, N. (2020). Phylogenetic classification of the family Terebridae (Neogastropoda: Conoidea). Journal of Molluscan Studies

Terebridae
Gastropods described in 1826